Kocuria rhizophila is a soil dwelling Gram-positive bacterium in the genus Kocuria. It is used in industry for antimicrobial testing and in food preparation.

Genome
The genome has been sequenced and contains 2,697,540 base pairs, which is among the smallest for Actinomycetota, with a G+C content of 71.16%. This encodes 2357 protein coding genes, including many transporters and enzymes for the transformation of phenolic compounds, contributing to its ability to metabolize plant material.

References

External links
Type strain of Kocuria rhizophila at BacDive -  the Bacterial Diversity Metadatabase

Micrococcaceae
Bacteria described in 1999